UltraStar Cinemas is a movie chain with theaters in California and Arizona. It was founded in 2004. 
UltraStar Cinemas is headquartered in San Diego County and operates 147 screens at 15 sites throughout Southern California and Arizona. Recognized for pioneering the digital age of cinema, UltraStar was the first theater group in the world to be fully equipped with Pure Digital Cinema powered by DLP Cinema technology in all of its locations. In 2009, the company also became the first to offer D-BOX motion seats, which use motion effects specifically programmed for each film to create an immersive experience for moviegoers.

On April 3, 2009, the Surprise Pointe 14 theatre in Surprise, Arizona with its 22 D-BOX Motion Controlled seats was among the first to present motion-enhanced theatrical films.  The Apple Valley, California theatre also features 22 D-BOX seats since July 15, 2009, with the release of Harry Potter and the Half-Blood Prince.  The Mission Valley, San Diego, California theatre installed 23 motion-enhanced seats for the opening of Sherlock Holmes on December 25, 2009.

On November 15, 2012, UltraStar Cinemas opened their doors to the brand new UltraStar Multi-Tainment Center at Ak-Chin Circle in Maricopa, Arizona. This complex boasts a 12-screen cinema, with a 21 and over dine-in section over each theater called the Starclass Cinemas; a 24-lane full service bowling alley, a two-story laser tag arena, full arcade, two bars, and two restaurants.

References

External links
 

Movie theatre chains in the United States
Entertainment companies based in California
Companies based in San Bernardino County, California
Redlands, California
American companies established in 2004
Entertainment companies established in 2004
2004 establishments in California
Privately held companies based in California